Tympanopleura is a genus of driftwood catfishes found mostly in South America with one species extending into Central America.

Species
There are currently 6 recognized species in this genus:
 Tympanopleura atronasus (C. H. Eigenmann & R. S. Eigenmann, 1888) 
 Tympanopleura brevis (Steindacnher, 1881) 
 Tympanopleura cryptica S. J. Walsh, F. R. V. Ribeiro & Rapp Py-Daniel, 2015 
 Tympanopleura longipinna S. J. Walsh, F. R. V. Ribeiro & Rapp Py-Daniel, 2015 
 Tympanopleura piperata C. H. Eigenmann, 1912 
 Tympanopleura rondoni (A. Miranda-Ribeiro, 1914)

References

Auchenipteridae
Fish of South America

Catfish genera
Taxa named by Carl H. Eigenmann